Crimini is an Italian television series.

Cast 
 Genti Kame : Igor
 Rodolfo Corsato : Giulio Campanga

See also
List of Italian television series

External links
 

Italian television series